Chaudhary Aslam Khan was a Pakistani police officer. From 2005 to 2014 Aslam arrested and killed terrorists, gangwar-criminals, target killers and extortionists belonging to MQM, TTP, BLA, TMP, LJ, LeT and SSP. On 9 January 2014, he was killed in a bomb blast carried out by Tehrik-i-Taliban Pakistan.

Life
Aslam was born in Dhodial, Mansehra District, Hazara Division to a Pashtun family and moved to Karachi along with his father after completing his primary education.

Career 
Aslam joined the Sindh Police force in 1984 as an Assistant sub-inspector and served in several police stations across Karachi and in Balochistan due to provincial allocation. Aslam worked as an encounter specialist from 1992 to 1994 and 1996 to 1997. Chaudhry was suspended and came back to service in 2004 and received the task of eradicating target killers. Later he was ordered to lead the LTF (Lyari Task Force) and end the gangwar in Lyari Town.

In 2010, Aslam was appointed as head of the Investigation Wing in the Criminal Investigation Department.

Aslam won himself a reputation for his performance in the 2012 'Lyari grand operation' which once again aimed at clearing the area of criminals.

2011 attack by Taliban 
In 2012, he escaped unhurt from a Taliban attack on his house in the Defence Phase VIII area of Karachi. The attack in which a suicide bomber detonated a truck bomb at his front gate, resulted in the death of eight people. TTP claimed responsibility for the attack as retaliation for ongoing efforts against them, including the arrest and killing of many of the terrorist organisation's members. At that time, a defiant Aslam, whose home was half blown away by the blast, said he knew he was the target but it would not deter him from fighting against extremists and that he would bury them in the same ground.

Death 
On 9 January 2014 he died along with two other officers, his guard and driver, when a bomb targeted his convoy on the Lyari expressway in Karachi. The Mohmand Agency chapter of the banned Tehrik-i-Taliban Pakistan (TTP) claimed responsibility for the attack. Sajjad Mohmand, a spokesman for the militant group, said Aslam was targeted for carrying out operations against the TTP. "Aslam was involved in killing Taliban prisoners in CID cells in Karachi and was on the top of our hit-list," he said.

In 2017 Kulbhushan Jadhav, an Indian national arrested in Balochistan on the allegations of spying and terrorism, confessed in a video released by the Director General of the ISPR that the assassination of Aslam was sponsored by Indian intelligence agency Research Analysis Wing on the directions of Anil Dhasmana. The validity of the video however has been criticised by the Indian side, claiming it to be doctored and forced upon Jadhav.

Reaction to death 
Prime Minister Muhammad Nawaz Sharif praised SSP CID Chaudhry Aslam and the other officers killed as martyrs and said that such attacks will not deter the law enforcement agencies in their fight against terrorism.

The Inter Services Public Relations (ISPR) issued a statement made by Army Chief General Raheel Sharif, acknowledging the contributions of police and other Law Enforcement Agencies (LEAs) in the fight against terror, and paying tribute to Chaudhry Aslam for laying down his life in the line of duty.

Then MQM chief Altaf Hussain also condemned the killing of SSP Chaudhry Aslam and his two colleagues. "SSP Chaudhry Aslam was active in fighting against terrorists who are carrying out subversive activities in Pakistan. He conducted operations against terrorists and criminal elements bravely", Altaf Hussain said.

2017 death investigation
Investigators in Karachi who were probing the death of Aslam revealed that his own driver/bodyguard was involved in the murder. The investigation team stated that the driver/bodyguard informed the terrorists of Aslams motorcades movement.

Biopic 

In 2019 it was announced that an action movie based on his life will be released, Chaudhry - The Martyr, directed by Azeem Sajjad. Chaudhry's role will be played by his cousin Chaudhry Tariq Islam, who hails from the same villages, is a DSP himself, and worked with Khan for over thirty years; the director acknowledged he had cast him because he's "well versed with [Khan's] body language, gestures, attitude and reflexes."

See also 
 Deaths in 2014
 Terrorist incidents in Pakistan in 2014
 Safwat Ghayur

References

2014 deaths
Pakistani police officers
People from Karachi
People killed by the Tehrik-i-Taliban Pakistan
People from Mansehra District
Insurgency in Khyber Pakhtunkhwa casualties
Hindkowan people
Pakistani terrorism victims
People murdered in Karachi
Terrorist incidents in Karachi
1967 births
2014 murders in Pakistan